There are 54 areas with over a thousand square miles of land under management of the Mississippi Department of Wildlife, Fisheries, and Parks and operated as Wildlife Management Areas (WMAs) in six regions:
Delta Region contains 14 WMAs
East Central Region contains 7 WMAs
North East Region contains 6 WMAs
North West Region contains 6 WMAs
South East Region contains 10 WMAs
South West Region contains 10 WMAs

List of Wildlife Management Areas

Chronic Wasting Disease
Chronic Wasting Disease has been discovered in Alcorn, Benton, Carroll, DeSoto, Lafayette, Leflore, Grenada, Issaquena, Lee, Marshall, Panola, Pontotoc, Prentiss, Quitman, the southern half of Sharkey, Sunflower, Tallahatchie, Tate, Tippah, Union, Warren, and Yalobusha, counties.

References

Wildlife Management Areas
 
Mississippi